Pseudofumaria alba (pale corydalis or white corydalis) is a short-lived perennial plant in the family Papaveraceae.

Flowers are white with yellow throats, borne in racemes on short, branched stems above the foliage from spring through autumn.

Leaves are gray-green and fern-like, and often remain through winter.

References

Fumarioideae